Bomberman Touch is a series of Bomberman games for iOS created by Hudson Soft. 

The first game, Bomberman Touch: The Legend of Mystic Bomb was released in as a launch title for the App Store. The sequel, Bomberman Touch 2: Volcano Party, released in 2009. The sequel adds multiplayer and online social interaction through the OpenFeint platform. It was later updated for Game Center support.

Reception

The Legend of Mystic Bomb received mixed reviews according to the review aggregation website GameRankings. IGN praised the visual aesthetics, soundtrack, story, online functionality and game mechanics of The Legend of Mystic Bomb.

Notes

References

External links
Official website for Bomberman Touch
Official website for Bomberman Touch 2

2008 video games
2009 video games
Touch
IOS games
IOS-only games
Konami franchises
Video games developed in Japan